The Manly-McCann House is a historic building located at 402 S. 4th St. in Marshall, Illinois. The Greek Revival building was constructed in 1838 to serve as a temporary courthouse for Clark County. While Clark County moved its county seat to Marshall in 1837, a permanent courthouse could not be completed until 1839, so a smaller temporary building became necessary. After the county government relocated, Marshall postmaster Uri Manly moved the city's post office and his store to the building. The building later became a private home and had several owners; one of the longer owners of the house was the McCann family, who owned the house from 1891 to 1947 and constructed several additions on the rear. The Clark County Historical Society bought the house in 1968 and uses it as the county's historical museum.

The house was added to the National Register of Historic Places on March 5, 1982.

References

External links
 Clark County Historical Society - Facebook site
 Clark County Historical Society & Museum - local information

Houses on the National Register of Historic Places in Illinois
Government buildings on the National Register of Historic Places in Illinois
Greek Revival houses in Illinois
Houses completed in 1838
Government buildings completed in 1838
Museums in Clark County, Illinois
Houses in Clark County, Illinois
National Register of Historic Places in Clark County, Illinois